Pensonic Holdings Berhad (stylized as PENSONIC) founded by Dato Chew Weng Khak is a company that started business as a small shop in Penang selling electrical appliances trading under the name of Keat Radio Co. in 1965 as a sole proprietor. In 1982, Chew started the PENSONIC brand name to produce locally manufactured electrical appliances in order to ensure long term growth of his company, and the brand name “PENSONIC” was invented by combining “Pen” and “sonic” to mean “Sound of Penang”.

Despite its popularity, there is a dispute between PENSONIC brand and Panasonic brand whereby the latter feels that the brand name of PENSONIC is too similar to Panasonic and may have capitalized on the market share of Panasonic. The dispute was eventually brought to the courts of law in several countries.

Panasonic had won an injunction in Singapore in November 2008 against PENSONIC after it has been operating for over 20 years. The PENSONIC name is considered by Panasonic as one of many knockoff names of Panasonic of Japan.

In Sri Lanka, PENSONIC has squashed the opposition of Panasonic for its trade mark registration in January 2009. The judgment observed that PENSONIC was registered in Malaysia in 1984 and the same was registered in Japan (the home country of Panasonic) and many countries in the world without the objection of Panasonic. This means that in these countries the two brands in fact historically co-exist.

Referenced

External links
 PENSONIC's official website
 Managing Intellectual Property: Panasonic beats PENSONIC
 Japanese blog showing knockoff products in Malaysia including PENSONIC
 Company Overview of Pensonic9 Holdings Berhad, bloomberg.com

1965 establishments in Malaysia
Electronics companies of Malaysia
Retail companies of Malaysia
Electronics companies established in 1965
Retail companies established in 1965
Malaysian companies established in 1965
Companies based in Penang
Companies listed on Bursa Malaysia
Malaysian brands
Radio manufacturers